The following outline is provided as an overview of and topical guide to the Cayman Islands:

Cayman Islands – British overseas territory located in the western Caribbean Sea, comprising the islands of Grand Cayman, Cayman Brac, and Little Cayman.  It is a tax haven financial centre and one of the many scuba diving destinations in the Caribbean.

General reference

 Pronunciation: /ðʉ ˈkaɪ.mɨn ˈaɪ.ləndz/
 Common English country name:  The Cayman Islands
 Official English country name:  The Cayman Islands
 Common endonym(s):  
 Official endonym(s):  
 Adjectival(s): Caymanian
 Demonym(s):
 ISO country codes: KY, CYM, 136
 ISO region codes: See ISO 3166-2:KY
 Internet country code top-level domain: .ky

Geography of the Cayman Islands 

Geography of the Cayman Islands
 The Cayman Islands are: a British overseas territory of three islands
 Location:
 Northern Hemisphere and Western Hemisphere
 North America (though not on the mainland)
 Atlantic Ocean
 North Atlantic
 Caribbean
 Time zone:  UTC-05
 Extreme points of the Cayman Islands
 High:  The Bluff on Cayman Brac 
 Low:  Caribbean Sea 0 m
 Land boundaries:  none
 Coastline:  160 km
 Population of the Cayman Islands: 62,000(2007) - 208th most populous country

 Area of the Cayman Islands:  - 207th largest country
 Atlas of the Cayman Islands

Environment of the Cayman Islands 

 Climate of the Cayman Islands
 Renewable energy in the Cayman Islands
 Geology of the Cayman Islands
 Protected areas of the Cayman Islands
 Biosphere reserves in the Cayman Islands
 National parks of the Cayman Islands
 Wildlife of the Cayman Islands
 Fauna of the Cayman Islands
 Birds of the Cayman Islands
 Mammals of the Cayman Islands

Natural geographic features of the Cayman Islands 

 Fjords of the Cayman Islands
 Glaciers of the Cayman Islands
 Islands of the Cayman Islands
 Lakes of the Cayman Islands
 Mountains of the Cayman Islands
 Volcanoes in the Cayman Islands
 Rivers of the Cayman Islands
 Waterfalls of the Cayman Islands
 Valleys of the Cayman Islands
 World Heritage Sites in the Cayman Islands: None

Regions of the Cayman Islands 

Regions of the Cayman Islands

Ecoregions of the Cayman Islands 

List of ecoregions in the Cayman Islands

Administrative divisions of the Cayman Islands 
None

Municipalities of the Cayman Islands 

 Capital of the Cayman Islands: George Town
 Cities of the Cayman Islands

Demography of the Cayman Islands 

Demographics of the Cayman Islands

Government and politics of the Cayman Islands 

Politics of the Cayman Islands
 Form of government: parliamentary representative democratic overseas territory
 Capital of the Cayman Islands: George Town
 Elections in the Cayman Islands
 Political parties in the Cayman Islands

Branches of the government of the Cayman Islands 

Government of the Cayman Islands

Executive branch of the government of the Cayman Islands 
 Head of state: Monarch of the United Kingdom, King Charles III
 Monarch's representative: Governor of the Cayman Islands
 Head of government: Premier of the Cayman Islands
 Cabinet of the Cayman Islands

Legislative branch of the government of the Cayman Islands 

 Legislative Assembly of the Cayman Islands (unicameral)

Judicial branch of the government of the Cayman Islands 

Court system of the Cayman Islands
 Privy Council of the United Kingdom - the highest court to appeal to
 Court of Appeal of the Cayman Islands - the highest court on the islands
 Grand Court of the Cayman Islands
 Chief Justice of the Cayman Islands

Foreign relations of the Cayman Islands 

Foreign relations of the Cayman Islands
 Diplomatic missions in the Cayman Islands
 Diplomatic missions of the Cayman Islands
 Immigration to the Cayman Islands

International organization membership 
The government of the Cayman Islands is a member of:
Caribbean Community and Common Market (Caricom) (associate)
Caribbean Development Bank (CDB)
International Criminal Police Organization (Interpol) (subbureau)
International Olympic Committee (IOC)
United Nations Educational, Scientific, and Cultural Organization (UNESCO) (associate)
Universal Postal Union (UPU)
World Federation of Trade Unions (WFTU)

Law and order in the Cayman Islands 

Law of the Cayman Islands
 Constitution of the Cayman Islands
 Crime in the Cayman Islands
 Human rights in the Cayman Islands
 LGBT rights in the Cayman Islands
 Freedom of religion in the Cayman Islands
 Law enforcement in the Cayman Islands

Military of the Cayman Islands 

Military of the Cayman Islands
 Command
 Commander-in-chief
 Ministry of Defence of the Cayman Islands
 Forces
 Army of the Cayman Islands
 Navy of the Cayman Islands
 Air Force of the Cayman Islands
 Special forces of the Cayman Islands
 Military history of the Cayman Islands
 Military ranks of the Cayman Islands

Local government in the Cayman Islands 

Local government in the Cayman Islands

History of the Cayman Islands 

History of the Cayman Islands
 Timeline of the history of the Cayman Islands
 Current events of the Cayman Islands
 Military history of the Cayman Islands

Culture of the Cayman Islands 

Culture of the Cayman Islands
 Architecture of the Cayman Islands
 Cuisine of the Cayman Islands
 Festivals in the Cayman Islands
 Languages of the Cayman Islands
 Media in the Cayman Islands
 National symbols of the Cayman Islands
 Coat of arms of the Cayman Islands
 Flag of the Cayman Islands
 National anthem of the Cayman Islands
 People of the Cayman Islands
 Public holidays in the Cayman Islands
 Records of the Cayman Islands
 Religion in the Cayman Islands
 Christianity in the Cayman Islands
 Hinduism in the Cayman Islands
 Islam in the Cayman Islands
 Judaism in the Cayman Islands
 Sikhism in the Cayman Islands
 World Heritage Sites in the Cayman Islands: None

Art in the Cayman Islands 
 Art in the Cayman Islands
 Cinema of the Cayman Islands
 Literature of the Cayman Islands
 Music of the Cayman Islands
 Television in the Cayman Islands
 Theatre in the Cayman Islands

Sports in the Cayman Islands 

Sports in the Cayman Islands
 Football in the Cayman Islands
 Cayman Islands at the Olympics
 Cayman Karting

Economy and infrastructure of the Cayman Islands 

Economy of the Cayman Islands
 Economic rank, by nominal GDP (2007): 151st (one hundred and fifty first)
 Agriculture in the Cayman Islands
 Banking in the Cayman Islands
 National Bank of the Cayman Islands
 Communications in the Cayman Islands
 Internet in the Cayman Islands
 Companies of the Cayman Islands
 Currency of the Cayman Islands: Dollar
ISO 4217: KYD
 Energy in the Cayman Islands
 Energy policy of the Cayman Islands
 Oil industry in the Cayman Islands
 Mining in the Cayman Islands
 Real estate in the Cayman Islands
 Cayman Islands Stock Exchange
 Tourism in the Cayman Islands
 Transport in the Cayman Islands
 Airports in the Cayman Islands

Education in the Cayman Islands 

Education in the Cayman Islands

See also

Cayman Islands
Index of Cayman Islands-related articles
List of Cayman Islands-related topics
List of international rankings
Outline of geography
Outline of North America
Outline of the Caribbean
Outline of the United Kingdom

References

External links

 Cayman Islands Government
 Cayman Islands Financial Services
 Cayman Travel Guide
 
 Cayman Islands. The World Factbook. Central Intelligence Agency.

Cayman Islands
Cayman Islands